David Clopton (September 29, 1820 – February 5, 1892) was a prominent Alabama politician.

Biography
Clopton was born in Putnam County, Georgia near Milledgeville, Ga., on September 29, 1820. He attended the county schools and Edenton Academy in Georgia, and moved to Alabama in 1844, graduating from Randolph-Macon College in 1840 and being admitted to the bar in 1841. He practiced law in Milledgeville, Ga. beginning in that year. In 1844, he moved to Tuskegee, Ala. and practiced law there.

Clopton represented Alabama's 3rd district in the United States House of Representatives as a Democrat beginning in 1859. During his term he was a strong supporter of states' rights; in a speech delivered during the struggle for the Speakership of the 36th Congress, he said the following: "We do not desire war. The policy of the South would be peace. But whenever this Government, in the opinion of the Southern people, shall have failed to accomplish the ends for which it was instituted, the Southern States, exercising their right, will abolish it, and institute a new Government, laying its foundation in such principles, and organizing it in such forms, as to them shall seem most likely to effect their safety and happiness. Whenever they see proper to exercise these rights, then, if war comes, it must come from the North. If war must come, let it come".

Clopton withdrew from the United States House of Representatives in 1861 and enlisted as a private in the Confederate Army in the Twelfth Alabama Infantry for one year.

Afterwards he represented Alabama in the First Confederate Congress and the Second Confederate Congress. He was among a group who wrote to the Alabama governor petitioning for the pardon of Robert Wynn, doorkeeper of the provisional Congress, who had been convicted of assault with intent to murder but later reconciled with his victim. As part of a Macon County consortium, he contracted with the Alabama Salt Commission to manufacture salt in Saltville, Virginia.

In 1887 he married Virginia Tunstall Clay, widow of Clement Claiborne Clay.

After the war, he served in the Alabama state legislature in 1878 and as an associate justice of the Alabama Supreme Court from 1884 until his death in Montgomery, Ala., February 5, 1892.  He is buried in Oakwood Cemetery.

References

 Retrieved on 2008-10-01
Political graveyard

External links

1820 births
1892 deaths
Randolph–Macon College alumni
Members of the Confederate House of Representatives from Alabama
People from Putnam County, Georgia
Justices of the Supreme Court of Alabama
Confederate States Army soldiers
People of Georgia (U.S. state) in the American Civil War
Auburn High School (Alabama) people
Democratic Party members of the United States House of Representatives from Alabama
19th-century American politicians
19th-century American judges